Isoxaprolol is an adrenergic antagonist with antiarrhythmic and antihypertensive properties.

References

Alpha blockers
Beta blockers
Isoxazoles
Tert-butyl compounds